Lincoln Park is one of the larger neighborhoods (in terms of area) in the city of Duluth, Minnesota, United States.

Lincoln Park is situated between Garfield Avenue to the ore docks at Carlton Street / 34th Avenue West.  The neighborhood stretches up the hill to Skyline Parkway.

Lincoln Park also refers to a large park within the neighborhood.

The main routes in the community are U.S. 53 / Piedmont Avenue; 24th Avenue West; and Michigan, Superior, First, and Third Streets.

Third Street had a road construction makeover in 2006; and U.S. 53 / Piedmont Avenue had a road construction makeover in 2004.  Both of these completed road projects have enhanced the neighborhood.

Miller Creek and Coffee Creek both flow through the neighborhood.  Goat Hill and Rice's Point are both located within the Lincoln Park neighborhood.  Garfield Avenue runs through the middle of Rice's Point.  The Duluth Harbor Basin is located along the eastern side of Rice's Point.  The Saint Louis Bay is located along the western side of Rice's Point and also below the John Blatnik Bridge (I-535).

A portion of that land is devoted to industrial and commercial uses.

The neighborhood was known as the West End until 1996 when it was officially renamed to the Lincoln Park neighborhood.

Lincoln Park business district
Lincoln Park has its own business district, which stretches along Michigan, Superior, and First Streets from 17th to 22nd Avenues West.

The business district is easily accessible from both Interstate Highway 35 and U.S. Highway 53.

Many businesses are also located elsewhere in the neighborhood, including the following locations:

 27th Avenue West and Michigan Street corridor area
 27th Avenue West and Superior Street corridor area
 West 3rd Street businesses between 21st Avenue West and Carlton Street

The city of Duluth's Main Post Office is located within the neighborhood on Michigan Street.  Local business establishments include the Clyde Iron Works Restaurant, Bar, and Event Center.

See also

Duluth, Minnesota
Central Hillside and Downtown Duluth (east)
Denfeld (west), part of West Duluth
Piedmont Heights (north)
Superior, Wisconsin (south, across I-535 and U.S. 53 – the John Blatnik Bridge)
Interstate Highway 35

References

External links
City of Duluth website
City map of neighborhoods (PDF)

Duluth–Superior metropolitan area
Neighborhoods in Duluth, Minnesota